The 2004 Teen Choice Awards ceremony was held on August 8, 2004, at the Universal Amphitheatre, Universal City, California. The event was hosted by Paris Hilton and Nicole Richie with Blink-182, JoJo, Lenny Kravitz, and Ashlee Simpson as performers. Mike Myers received the Ultimate Choice Award, Bethany Hamilton received the Courage Award, Tony Hawk and Mia Hamm received the Male and Female Athlete Awards respectively, Adam Sandler received the Comedian Award, and Ashlee Simpson received the Fresh Face Award.

Performers
Blink 182 – "Down"
JoJo – "Leave (Get Out)"
Lenny Kravitz – "Where Are We Runnin'?"
Ashlee Simpson – "Pieces of Me"

Presenters

Jessica Alba
Tyra Banks
Mischa Barton
Seth Green
Anne Hathaway
Tony Hawk
Sean Hayes
Jon Heder
J-Kwon
Janet Jackson
Jesse James
Kristin Kreuk
James Lafferty
Leatherface
Matthew Lillard
Jesse McCartney
Christina Milian
Brittany Murphy
Chad Michael Murray
Kelly Osbourne
Sharon Osbourne
Chris Pratt
Raven-Symoné
Redman
Method Man
Dax Shepard
Gregory Smith
Verne Troyer
Wilmer Valderrama
Alexa Vega
Makenzie Vega
Tom Welling
Serena Williams
Xzibit

Winners and nominees
Winners are listed first and highlighted in bold text.

Movies

Television

Music

Miscellaneous

References

2004 awards
2004 in American music
2004 in California
2000s in Los Angeles
August 2004 events in the United States
2004